{{Automatic taxobox
| image = Mimon bennettii.jpg
| image_caption = Golden bat (Mimon bennettii)
| taxon = Mimon
| authority = Gray, 1847
| type_species = Phyllostoma bennetti| type_species_authority = Gray, 1838
| subdivision_ranks = Species
| subdivision = Mimon bennettiiMimon cozumelaeMimon crenulatumMimon koepckeae}}Mimon is a bat genus from South America.

Species
Genus: Mimon - Gray's spear-nosed bats
Golden bat, Mimon bennettiiCozumelan golden bat, Mimon cozumelaeStriped hairy-nosed bat, Mimon crenulatumKoepcke's hairy-nosed bat, Mimon koepckeae''

References

The Taxonomicon

Bats of South America
Mammals of Brazil
Phyllostomidae
Bat genera
Taxa named by John Edward Gray